General elections were held in Singapore on 2 January 1997. President Ong Teng Cheong dissolved parliament on 16 December 1996 on the advice of Prime Minister Goh Chok Tong.  The election results were released in the late evening that day and the ruling People's Action Party won a total of 81 out of 83 seats as well as a tenth consecutive term in office under the then-Prime Minister Goh Chok Tong. Other major political parties contesting in the election were the Workers' Party, Singapore Democratic Party, National Solidarity Party, Singapore People's Party and the Democratic Progressive Party.

After nomination day on 23 December 1996, the People's Action Party returned to power for the second consecutive (and third overall) election as 47 (more than half of the total 83) seats were won uncontested. On polling day, voters voted for the election for the remaining 36 seats, with the opposition party candidates winning only in two seats, down from the four they won in the last election. In this election, Group Representation Constituencies were increased from four members to between four and six members (six-member seats would remain present for two decades until its first absence in the 2020 election).

Background
This election was Prime Minister Goh Chok Tong's opportunity to score a better mandate after the PAP's considerably poorer showing in the 1991 election. Two seats in PAP-held Eunos and Toa Payoh GRCs were vacated after the death of Member of Parliament (MP), Dr Tay Eng Soon and inauguration of former Deputy Prime Minister Ong Teng Cheong as Singapore's fifth and first elected President in 1993 respectively; however, both GRCs did not held by-elections and were instead subsumed into neighbouring GRCs. A third incumbent, Lim Chee Oon of the Marine Parade GRC, retired from politics ahead of the by-election in 1992, and future Minister Teo Chee Hean (now as Senior Minister) succeeded Lim.

In 1993, a year following the events of the Marine Parade GRC by-election, the largest opposition party, Singapore Democratic Party, faced a serious internal strife where former leader and Potong Pasir then-MP Chiam See Tong sued his party's Central Executive Committee (which include current secretary-general Chee Soon Juan and chairman Ling How Doong) for defamation, which he won; Chiam resigned from SDP prior to nominations to lead his splinter party, Singapore People's Party. In 1994, Chee criticized then-Deputy Prime Minister Lee Hsien Loong over a lack of democracy, which led to the attention of Organising Secretary and Marine Parade GRC member-of-parliament Matthias Yao; Chee publicly request to challenge Yao with a condition of carving out his MacPherson ward from Marine Parade GRC into a SMC, which the latter accepted.

Timeline

Nominations and campaigning
The 8th Parliament was dissolved on 16 December 1996, and nominations were held exactly a week after. At the close of the nomination, 122 candidates were nominated among which PAP returned to power for the second consecutive (and third) election after a majority of seats (47) were uncontested; among which were Tampines GRC, which the National Solidarity Party team was disqualified after one candidate was found to have his name struck off the electoral rolls for not voting in 1991. Chia Shi Teck became the first former Nominated MP to contest in the election as an independent candidate in an only four-cornered fight in Chua Chu Kang SMC. The Democratic Progressive Party, formerly named Singapore United Front, contested by a father-son duo led by Tan Soon Phuan and Tan Lead Shake (the latter now a member of NSP).

During campaigning, Tang Liang Hong, who was standing on the WP ticket with its secretary-general J. B. Jeyaretnam for Cheng San GRC, faced criticism where Tang was accused by PAP of being an anti-Christian Chinese chauvinist.

Electoral boundaries

New six-member Group Representation Constituencies (GRC) were formed in the election, while six existing GRCs were absorbed into neighboring GRCs. Divisions of each constituencies which were either absorbed or carved out Single Member Constituencies (SMC), or creating smaller divisions, were reflected in the table:

New and retiring candidates
24 PAP and 18 opposition candidates were among the candidates making their election debuts this year, while 17 incumbents were to retire ahead of the election. The list are as follows:

Results
The voter turnout in contested constituencies at 95.91% is Singapore's highest election turnout in history.

By constituency

Aftermath
With the Housing Development Board (public housing) upgrading scheme dangled as a pricy stake for voters, PAP reversed its electoral decline for the first time in four elections with an increase of four percentage points, and it was the first election since 1963 to wrestle back two of four opposition wards (namely Bukit Gombak and Nee Soon Central) which was previously captured in the last election; due to Chiam's defection to SPP, SDP failed to win any seats and no longer have any seat representation since 1984; till this day SDP had never won any seats as of the 2020 election.

With the election of two opposition MPs (SPP's Chiam and WP's assistant secretary-general Low Thia Khiang), one Non-Constituency Member of Parliament seat was offered to the WP team of Cheng San Group Representation Constituency with the best-performing losing opposition team, which scored 45.2%; WP accepted the offer and elected secretary-general Jeyaretnam as the NCMP, making his return to the Parliament since 1986. 

In June 1997, when Nominated MPs were re-appointed, the number was increased from six to nine. On 6 September 1999, the 9th Parliament was relocated to the New Parliament House located within the Civic District facing North Bridge Road, while the former Parliament House was closed until it reopened on 26 March 2004, in which it was renamed to The Arts House.

Tang Liang Hong's self-imposed exile

After the election, WP candidate for Cheng San Group Representation Constituency, Tang Liang Hong was sued for defamation by several of the PAP's leaders, including then-Prime Minister Goh Chok Tong, then-Senior Minister Lee Kuan Yew and then-Deputy Prime Ministers Lee Hsien Loong and Tony Tan, who accused him of making statements during the campaign which falsely questioned their integrity. A total of 13 judgements were entered against Tang for defamation.

Tang left Singapore shortly after the election and eventually found refuge in Australia.

Notes

References

External links

 Official elections webpage – Elections Department Singapore
 Singapore-elections – a comprehensive archive of elections results, as well as past ones

Official websites of political parties
 National Solidarity Party 
 People's Action Party, Manifesto (PDF)
 Singapore Malay National Organisation, (Pertubuhan Kebangsaan Melayu Singapura)
 Singapore Democratic Party, Manifesto
 Singapore People's Party, Manifesto
 Workers' Party of Singapore, Manifesto 2006

General elections in Singapore
Singaporean general election, 1997
Singaporean general election, 1997